"Closest Thing to Heaven" is a song by the British band Tears for Fears. In the UK, it was released as the first single from their sixth studio album, Everybody Loves a Happy Ending (2004) and was the first single to feature both original members, Roland Orzabal and Curt Smith, since 1990.

The song was Tears for Fears' first UK top-40 hit since "Raoul and the Kings of Spain" in 1995, reaching number 40 on the UK Singles Chart. It also reached number 12 in Finland and number 38 in the Netherlands.

Music video
The promo video for "Closest Thing to Heaven" was directed by Michael Palmieri (who has also worked with Foo Fighters and Beck), and is a colourful theatrical fantasy featuring the Hollywood actress Brittany Murphy.

Track listing
CD3: Gut/EU0161836ERE
 "Closest Thing to Heaven" (UK Radio Mix) - 3:22
 "Closest Thing to Heaven" (Solasso Dub) - 5:33

CD5: Gut/CDGUT66
 "Closest Thing to Heaven" (UK Radio Mix) - 3:22
 "Closest Thing to Heaven" (Brothers In Rhythm Group Therapy Mix) - 8:15
 "Closest Thing to Heaven" (Solasso Club Mix) - 5:49
 "Closest Thing to Heaven" (Brothers In Rhythm Group Therapy Dub) - 8:15
 "Closest Thing to Heaven" (Solasso Dub) - 5:33

Charts

References

Tears for Fears songs
2004 songs
2005 singles
Songs written by Curt Smith
Songs written by Roland Orzabal